Phyllanthus mirabilis is a plant species of family Phyllanthaceae and is native to Thailand, Laos and Myanmar. It is one of the only four Phyllanthus to be caudiciform and the one of the only two caudiciform Phyllanthus to be described, with the other being Phyllanthus kaweesakii. The leaves fold together at night. Wild plants are found on limestone mountains and cliffs.

References

mirabilis
Taxa named by Johannes Müller Argoviensis
Caudiciform plants